Oscar Byström (31 December 1857 – 4 June 1938) was a Swedish actor. 

Byström debuted in 1884 at the Royal Dramatic Theatre.  During 1885-1886, when he was involved in the theater company of  Oscar Sternvall-Skottes . Byström was  employed at the Royal Dramatic Theatre from 1890-1893. From 1907, he was as deputy director at the Vasateatern.
His career in film started with a small role in Gösta Berlings saga (1924). He was married in  1896 to actress  Constance Ericsson-Behrens  
(1868-1952).

Filmography
 Gösta Berlings saga (1924)
 A Perfect Gentleman (1927)
 The Ghost Baron (1927)
 Jansson's Temptation (1928)
 The Girl from Värmland (1931)
 Markurells i Wadköping (1931)
 Modern Wives (1932)
 Dear Relatives (1933)
 Unfriendly Relations (1936)

References

External links
 

1857 births
1938 deaths
Swedish male film actors
Swedish male silent film actors
20th-century Swedish male actors
Burials at Norra begravningsplatsen